The next United Kingdom general election is scheduled to be held no later than 24 January 2025. It will determine the composition of the House of Commons.

Background
The next election is scheduled to be held no later than January 2025, with Parliament being dissolved no later than 17 December 2024, after the Dissolution and Calling of Parliament Act 2022 repealed the Fixed-term Parliaments Act 2011.

The result of the 2019 general election and members in the House of Commons is given below.

Ahead of this general election, HuffPost reported in March 2022 that the Labour Party had abandoned all-women shortlists, citing legal advice that continuing to use them for choosing parliamentary candidates would become an unlawful practice again under the Equality Act 2010.

Following the UK Supreme Court's decision in November 2022, that a proposed second Scottish independence referendum is outside the competence of the Scottish Parliament, First Minister Nicola Sturgeon (SNP) announced her intention to treat the next general election as a de facto independence referendum. Unionist parties have rejected this characterisation.

Electoral system

General elections in the United Kingdom are organised using first-past-the-post voting. The Conservative Party, which won a majority at the 2019 general election, included pledges in its manifesto to remove the 15-year limit on voting for British citizens living abroad, and to introduce a voter identification requirement in Great Britain. Provisions for these changes have been enacted in the Elections Act 2022.

Boundary reviews
The Sixth Periodic Review of Westminster constituencies, which proposed reducing the number of constituencies from 650 to 600, was commenced in 2011, but temporarily stopped in January 2013. Following the 2015 general election, each of the four parliamentary boundary commissions of the United Kingdom recommenced their review process in April 2016. The four commissions submitted their final recommendations to the Secretary of State on 5 September 2018 and made their reports public a week later. However, the proposals were never put forward for approval before the calling of the general election held on 12 December 2019, and in December 2020 the reviews were formally abandoned under the Schedule to the Parliamentary Constituencies Act 2020.

A projection by psephologists Colin Rallings and Michael Thrasher of how the 2017 votes would have translated to seats under the new boundaries suggested the changes would have been beneficial to the Conservative Party and detrimental to the Labour Party.

In March 2020, Cabinet Office minister Chloe Smith confirmed that the 2023 Periodic Review of Westminster constituencies would be based on retaining 650 seats. The previous relevant legislation was amended by the Parliamentary Constituencies Act 2020 and the four boundary commissions formally launched their 2023 reviews on 5 January 2021. They are required to issue their final reports prior to 1 July 2023. Once the reports have been laid before Parliament, Orders in Council giving effect to the final proposals must be made within four months, unless "there are exceptional circumstances". Prior to the Parliamentary Constituencies Act 2020, boundary changes could not be implemented until they were approved by both Houses of Parliament.

Date of the election
At the 2019 general election, where the Conservatives won a majority of 80 seats, the manifesto of the party contained a commitment to repeal the Fixed-term Parliaments Act due to "paralysis at a time when the country has needed decisive action". The pledge was confirmed in the first Queen's Speech following the election.

In December 2020, the government published a draft Fixed-term Parliaments Act 2011 (Repeal) Bill, later retitled the Dissolution and Calling of Parliament Act 2022. In September 2021, Oliver Dowden, the newly appointed chairman of the Conservative Party, told party staff to prepare for a general election. The Daily Telegraph reported that an election could be held in May or June 2023. In March 2022, Dowden announced that the Conservatives would start a two-year election campaign in May, implying an election date of May 2024. On becoming Conservative leader in September 2022, Liz Truss said she would deliver "a great victory for the Conservative Party in 2024".

The Dissolution and Calling of Parliament Act 2022 received royal assent on 24 March 2022 and entered into force the same day. The prime minister can again request the monarch to dissolve Parliament and call an early election with 25 working days' notice. Section 4 of the Act provided: "If it has not been dissolved earlier, a Parliament dissolves at the beginning of the day that is the fifth anniversary of the day on which it first met." For the MPs elected in the 2019 United Kingdom general election, who first met on 17 December 2019, this means the fifth-anniversary date of 17 December 2024 and the latest possible polling day 25 working days later, which is 24 January 2025.

Members of Parliament not standing for re-election
As of 18 March 2023, a total of 40 Members of Parliament have announced their decision not to stand for re-election (Conservative: 26, Labour: 12, Plaid Cymru: 1, Independent: 1).

Members of Parliament deselected

Some sitting MPs have not been selected by their party to recontest their seat (or a successor seat). Options available to these MPs include retirement, challenging their non-selection, seeking selection for another seat, and contesting the election under a different banner.

 Richard Bacon, Conservative, South Norfolk (deselected by the Conservative Association)
 Theo Clarke, Conservative, Stafford (deselected by the Conservative Association)
 Jeremy Corbyn, Labour, Islington North (Corbyn sits as an independent but remains a member of the Labour Party)
 Damian Green, Conservative, Ashford (Green sought selection for the new seat of Weald of Kent)
 Sally-Ann Hart, Conservative, Hastings and Rye (deselected by the Conservative Association)
 Neil Hudson, Conservative, Penrith and The Border (Hudson sought selection for the new seat of Penrith and Solway)
 Sam Tarry, Labour, Ilford South (deselected by the Constituency Labour Party in favour of Jas Athwal)
 Claudia Webbe, formerly Labour, Leicester East (Webbe has been expelled from the Labour Party and sits as an independent)

Opinion polling

Notes

References

General elections to the Parliament of the United Kingdom
 
2025 elections in the United Kingdom